Göle District is a district of Ardahan Province of Turkey. Its seat is the town Göle. Its area is 1,290 km2, and its population is 23,933 (2021).

Göle is a rural district, eighty per cent of the area comprising mountain and forest, with the remainder grazing land and meadow; the local economy depends on this grazing. Göle is famous for its yellow kaşar cheese. Some crops are grown, including grains and potatoes. With the high Allahuekber Mountains to the south Göle is exposed to the north resulting in cold winters.

Composition
There are two municipalities in Göle District:
 Göle
 Köprülü (Korehenk)

There are 49 villages in Göle District. The old names of the villages are noted after in parentheses.

 Arpaşen (Ağılylu)
 Balçeşme (Lalavargenis)
 Bellitepe (Urut)
 Budaklı (Cicor)
 Büyükaltınbulak
 Çakıldere (Orakilise)
 Çakırüzüm (Muzaret)
 Çalıdere (Mihgerek)
 Çardaklı
 Çayırbaşı (Hokam)
 Çobanköy
 Çullu
 Damlasu (Sasadel)
 Dedekılıcı (Kaşar)
 Dengeli (Abur)
 Dereyolu (Salot)
 Dölekçayır (Pilemor)
 Durucasu
 Esenboğaz (Kelpikor)
 Esenyayla
 Eskidemirkapı
 Filizli (Sivin)
 Gedik (Lavustan)
 Gülistan
 Günorta (Kızılkilise)
 Hoşdülbent
 Kalecik
 Karlıyazı (Kirziyan)
 Kayaaltı (Poladik)
 Koyunlu
 Küçükaltınbulak
 Kuytuca (Şekki)
 Mollahasan
 Okçu
 Samandöken (Sinot)
 Senemoğlu
 Serinçayır (Çölpenek)
 Sürügüden (Heve)
 Tahtakıran
 Tellioğlu
 Toptaş
 Uğurtaşı
 Yağmuroğlu
 Yanatlı (Varkenez/Varginis)
 Yavuzlar (Üçkilise)
 Yeleçli (Samzelek)
 Yenidemirkapı
 Yeniköy
 Yiğitkonağı (Türkeşen)

References

Districts of Ardahan Province